Vesperus luridus is a species of beetle in the Vesperidae family

Description
Elytra are elongate and body is slender. Basic coloration is brownish or yellowish diaphanous. Both males and females are of the same colour,

This species shows an evident sexual dimorphism. The males are small, have wings and the elytra completely cover the abdomen. The antennas are much longer than in females. On the contrary the females are bigger, have very reduced wings (brachyptery) and are characterised by a swollen abdomen (physogastrism) holding enlarged ovaries. Elytra cover only partially the voluminous abdomen, letting visible the abdominal tergites.

Adults of this species are nocturnals and can be encountered from late summer to autumn. The flying males become active at dusk and are attracted by artificial light. Larvae of these beetles have evolved some adaptations to subterranean life. In particular, they are characterised by a peculiar larval hypermetamorphosis, with some polymorphic larval instars. Larvae are polyphagous, but mainly feed on Grape-vine (Vitis vinifera) and Common Olive (Olea europaea). They are considered harmful to the cultivation of the grapevines, as the larvae dig tunnels in the roots.

Distribution
This species can be found in Croatia, France, Italy (including islands Sardinia and Sicily), Kosovo, Montenegro, Serbia, and Voivodina.

References

External links
Image of a female Vesperus luridus on Flickr
Worldwide Cerambycoidea Photo Gallery

Vesperidae
Beetles described in 1794
Beetles of Europe
Taxa named by Pietro Rossi